Raymond Stasse (30 April 1913 – 9 July 1987) was a Belgian Olympic fencer. He competed at the 1936 and 1948 Summer Olympics.

References

1913 births
1987 deaths
Belgian male fencers
Olympic fencers of Belgium
Fencers at the 1936 Summer Olympics
Fencers at the 1948 Summer Olympics